Akeman Street is a Roman road in southern England between the modern counties of Hertfordshire and Gloucestershire.

Akeman Street linked Watling Street just north of Verulamium (near modern St Albans) with the Fosse Way at Corinium Dobunnorum (now Cirencester). Evidence suggests that the route may well have been an older track, metalled and reorganised by the Romans. Its course passes through towns and villages including Hemel Hempstead, Berkhamsted, Tring, Aylesbury, Alchester (outside modern Bicester), Chesterton, Kirtlington, Ramsden and Asthall.

Parts of the A41 road between Berkhamsted and Bicester use the course of the former Roman road, as did the Sparrows Herne turnpike between Berkhamsted and Aylesbury. A minor road between Chesterton and Kirtlington also uses its course. Other parts are in use as public footpaths, including a  stretch between Tackley and Stonesfield that is part of the Oxfordshire Way.

The origins of the road's name are uncertain but certainly date back to the Early Middle Ages. Some have suggested that "Akeman" derives from the Anglo-Saxon words for "oak-man". Others have suggested a connection with Bath, which the Anglo-Saxons called Acemannesceastre (Acemannes apparently being derived from the Roman name Aquae Sulis). It is unclear how this might have become associated with the road, but one possibility is that the name was originally used for the long stretch of road from Bath.


See also
Akeman Street (Cambridgeshire)
Roman Britain
 Roman roads in Britain
 RAF Akeman Street

References

Bibliography
 
 

Roman roads in England
Archaeological sites in Hertfordshire
Archaeological sites in Buckinghamshire
Archaeological sites in Oxfordshire
Berkhamsted
Aylesbury